The 1969–70 Yugoslav First Basketball League season was the 26th season of the Yugoslav First Basketball League, the highest professional basketball league in SFR Yugoslavia.

Classification

Results 

Source:

The winning roster of Olimpija:
  Andrej Osterc
  Marko Gvardijančič
  Vital Eiselt
  Borut Bassin
  Jože Fišer
  Peter Marter
  Jure Božič
  Pavle Polanec
  Dušan Verbič
  Vinko Jelovac
  Darko Hočevar
  Djuro Lemajić
  Ivo Daneu
  Emil Logar
  Aljoša Žorga

Coach:  Milan Tošić

Qualification in 1970-71 season European competitions 

FIBA European Champions Cup
 Olimpija (champions)

FIBA Cup Winner's Cup
 Zadar (Cup winners)

References

Yugoslav First Basketball League seasons
Yugo
Yugo